Gilroy Roberts (March 11, 1905, Philadelphia – January 26, 1992 Havertown, Pennsylvania) was an American sculptor. He served as the ninth Chief Engraver of the United States Mint from 1948 until 1964, and is perhaps most famous for designing the obverse of the Kennedy Half Dollar.  At the Philadelphia Mint he was designing and engraving coins, and presidential and congressional medals.

After he left the U.S. Mint in 1964 he worked for The Franklin Mint, a private foundation that was established in the same year.

References

1905 births
1992 deaths
United States Mint engravers
American male sculptors
20th-century American sculptors
20th-century American male artists
Sculptors from Pennsylvania
Artists from Philadelphia
20th-century engravers